Liverpool Riverside is a constituency represented in the House of Commons of the UK Parliament since 2019 by Kim Johnson, who is a member of the Labour Party.

Constituency profile
Liverpool Riverside covers an urban area, many neighbourhoods and households of which are economically deprived on relative and absolute measures.  The latter 20th century economic history of Liverpool cost many jobs, businesses and sources of investment to the city leading to urban blight and the return of widespread generational poverty, not seen since the 19th century.  The city's 21st century economic history has been increasing prosperous, seeing growth amongst its financial sector, innovative technology businesses, tourism and entertainment gigs and events.  The re-investment has been heightened by heavily used high rise buildings by leading architects, principally the Tate Liverpool and an adjoining block, and publicly funded transport and services improvements.

History
Creation
Liverpool Riverside was created in 1983, merging most of the old Liverpool Scotland Exchange and Liverpool Toxteth constituencies. A provisional recommendation by the Boundary Commission was for the name Liverpool Abercromby, dropped during the local consultations, during which an alternate name of Liverpool Cathedrals was also proposed.

Results of the winning party
The area has been held by the Labour Party since the 1964 election (including predecessor seats); 1983—1997 by Robert Parry (ex-MP for Scotland Exchange, from 1974), 1997—2019 by Louise Ellman, and 2019—date by Kim Johnson. The 2017 result made the seat the 3rd safest seat by percentage of majority.

Results of other parties
The 2005 general election saw much more than the national average swing (+8.1%) to the Liberal Democrat candidate (compared with 3.4% nationwide), however Labour's candidate won more than double that share of the vote, scoring 57%. In the same election the area was one of several urban seats in which the Green Party retained its deposit by its candidate scoring just over 5% of the vote.  The last time until 2017 that the Conservatives fielded a candidate who achieved second place was in 1992.  That party took third place in 2015 behind the highest polling to date for any candidate from the Green Party across Merseyside. Despite the Conservatives managing to come second in the seat in 2017, this was significantly overshadowed by the fact Labour won over 84% of the vote and a majority of 35,947 (74.8%), the biggest margin by both popular vote and percentage majority the party has ever won in the seat.

Turnout
In the 2001 and 2005 general elections it had the lowest turnout of all constituencies of the UK.  In a contest where positions of runner-up candidates greatly changed, turnout exceeded 62% in the 2015 election. This slightly increased to 62.9% in 2017, which remains below the average (the 2017 election had a total turnout of 68.8%), but significantly less so than has previously been the case in the constituency.

Boundaries

1983–1997: The City of Liverpool wards of Abercromby, Arundel, Dingle, Everton, Granby, and Vauxhall.

1997–2010: The City of Liverpool wards of Abercromby, Aigburth, Arundel, Dingle, Everton, Granby, Smithdown, and Vauxhall.

2010–present: The City of Liverpool wards of Central, Greenbank, Kirkdale, Mossley Hill, Princes Park, Sefton Park, Riverside, and St Michael's.

The constituency is one of five covering the city of Liverpool. It covers the central area of the city, including famous sights of the city such as the Royal Liver Building and Albert Dock.  Neighbourhoods include Aigburth, Canning, Chinatown, Dingle, Kirkdale, Part of Mossley Hill, St Michael's Hamlet, Toxteth and Vauxhall. It contains the University of Liverpool and Liverpool John Moores University.

Members of Parliament

Elections

Elections in the 2010s

Elections in the 2000s
The turnout compared to the 2001 election had risen by 7.4% to 41.5% (an above average increase). However, this was still the lowest throughout the United Kingdom which averaged 61.3% with a 2.1% increase.

In the 2001 election it had a turnout of 34.1% which was the lowest of the United Kingdom. The average turnout in that year was 59.2%.

Elections in the 1990s

Elections in the 1980s

See also 
List of parliamentary constituencies in Merseyside

Notes

References

Parliamentary constituencies in North West England
Liverpool parliamentary constituencies
Constituencies of the Parliament of the United Kingdom established in 1983
Toxteth